The Evans Cherry also sold under the name 'Bali', is a sour cherry (Prunus cerasus) cultivar rediscovered in an old orchard near Edmonton, Alberta, Canada, and is significant because cherries were not considered viable in the harsh climate of the Canadian prairies, yet the specimen, discovered by Ieuan Evans, had been growing there since the 1920s. Grown on its own rootstock and self-pollinating, the Evans Cherry displays white blossoms in spring and bears abundant fruit.

Evans once thought the cherry  originated in Minnesota, but according to more recent reports, he believes it may have come from Alaska where Evans Cherry trees were given out to settlers.

Characteristics
The Evans Cherry cultivar grows from  – other sour cherries are taller – with abundant white blossoms in spring, bright red fruit at an average weight of 0.15 ounces (4.4 grams), and juice that is pink-tinted to clear. The tree can be grown on its own root stock so there are no grafting problems; an advantage, since with grafting there can be incompatibility between the top or shoot and the grafted root stock, or a poor graft union can cause a trunk to split later on as the tree grows larger. Best trained as a tree rather than bush to make harvest of fruit easiest, the Evans Cherry is a self-fruitful, zone 3a cherry with a ripening season in North America in August.

History
Ieuan Evans, who is a horticulturist,  and was a specialist in  plant disease and a research scientist for Alberta Agriculture, discovered a gardener, identified as "Mrs Bower," who lived northeast of Edmonton near Fort Saskatchewan.  She had been growing cherry trees which bore abundant fruit that dated to 1923. The orchard was being destroyed to make room to build a  Federal jail, so Boward invited Evans to take some of the orchard's trees both for the Alberta Tree Nursery and for his personal use. Evans discovered suckers from the cherry trees were easy to propagate and to grow so he distributed them to a wide circle of acquaintances and friends. Response from those growing the  vigorous tree with its excellent fruit was very positive.  However at that time, nurseries refused to sell the now-named Evans Cherry tree believing, despite the evidence, that cherries would not grow on the Canadian prairies. Eventually, nurseries like the DNA Gardens near Red Deer, Alberta began propagation and selling the trees.  Later, a Winnipeg Manitoba nursery began selling thousands of the trees, and at present they sell out every year. The tree, now in the public domain, has been sold as cuttings as well as having been tissue cultured in parts of Canada and the United States.

References

External links 
 Alberta's Little Cherry Miracle
 University of British Columbia
 History of the Evans Cherry
 Dwarf Sour Cherries on the Prairies
 Canadian Cherry producers

Cherry cultivars
Crops originating from Canada
History of Alberta
Sour cherries